Abigail (Hungarian: Abigél) is a young adult novel by the Hungarian author Magda Szabó. It was first published in 1970 and is her most widely read novel. Abigail is an adventure story about a teenage girl who attends a Calvinist girls' school in eastern Hungary during World War II.

In the Hungarian Big Read in 2005, it was voted the sixth most popular novel in Hungary. It was the third most popular Hungarian novel on the list. The novel has been translated into Catalan, Czech, French, German, Italian, Latvian, Polish, and Romanian. An English translation by Len Rix was published in January 2020. A Hungarian audiobook is read by Ildikó Piros (who played Sister Susanna in the TV series), and an English audiobook is read by Samantha Desz.

Plot summary

The main character of the novel is Georgina "Gina" Vitay, a girl from Budapest, the daughter of a general, her mother died early, her governess had to leave Hungary by the beginning of the Second World War. In 1943, her father, without an explanation, from one day to the next sends Gina away to the Matula Institute, an old and traditional Calvinist girls' boarding school in the fictional Protestant town of Árkod in easternmost Hungary. The closed Puritan world of Matula forces Gina, who is used to individualism and freedom, to give up her former life. The strict rules, the education by deaconesses, the busy schedule of the pupils, as well as the pious life in Árkod are far from her previous home.

On her second day at school, Gina flies into a rage and reveals one of the secrets of her classmates to the headmaster of the institute, which makes her classmates ostracize her for months. Gina feels lonely and seeks a way to escape to Budapest. Her attempt fails as one of the teachers finds her and takes her back to the school, but her decision makes her father tell her why she must stay in Árkod: General Vitay is the leader of a resistance group within the Hungarian military, and he does not want his enemies to find his daughter. Learning this, Gina shows maturity as she voluntarily accepts her "captivity" and finally reconciles with the others. The school seems to be not so rigorous, as Gina accepts some of Matula's traditions, which until then she found childish.

The school's greatest legend has been woven around the statue in the garden, which the girls name Abigail. The mysterious benefactor who helps everyone if they write Abigail a letter appears in Gina's life too. Moreover, he or she not only solves adolescent problems, but takes on serious social responsibilities, such as getting new identity documents for students who have Jewish ancestry.

Gina's father does not telephone her for months and she has to stay in the school even at Christmas. Early in spring, her suitor from home, Feri Kuncz, appears in the city and says that he wants to bring her secretly to her father, who he pretends is ill and is waiting for her. The plan fails, but still, Gina has to leave Árkod. The winds of war have arrived at the seemingly impregnable Matula. Helped by Mici Horn, an ex-pupil of Matula and a war widow, Gina escapes from Árkod and gets a new identity. 

At the end of the novel, Gina finds out that Mr. Kőnig, a teacher whom she hated and looked down on during the school year, is actually Abigail, her greatest helper and the saver of many lives.

Adaptations
The novel's success resulted in a TV series, produced in 1978. The novel was also adapted as a musical that premiered in March 2008.

References

External links
The text of the novel in Hungarian

1970 novels
1970 children's books
Hungarian children's literature
Hungarian novels
Young adult novels
Novels set during World War II
Novels set in Hungary
Novels set in high schools and secondary schools
Novels set in boarding schools